John Dooley may refer to:

 John Dooley (politician) (1883–1961), Australian politician
 John Dooley (judge) (born 1944), justice of the Vermont Supreme Court
 John Dooley (American football), American football coach
 John Mike Dooley, Irish hurler
 John M. Dooley (1897–1991), American football player

See also
 John Dooly (1740–1780), American Revolutionary war hero